This article is about the particular significance of the year 1787 to Wales and its people.

Incumbents
Lord Lieutenant of Anglesey - Henry Paget 
Lord Lieutenant of Brecknockshire and Monmouthshire – Charles Morgan of Dderw (until 24 May); Henry Somerset, 5th Duke of Beaufort (from 8 June)
Lord Lieutenant of Caernarvonshire - Thomas Bulkeley, 7th Viscount Bulkeley
Lord Lieutenant of Cardiganshire – Wilmot Vaughan, 1st Earl of Lisburne
Lord Lieutenant of Carmarthenshire – John Vaughan  
Lord Lieutenant of Denbighshire - Richard Myddelton  
Lord Lieutenant of Flintshire - Sir Roger Mostyn, 5th Baronet 
Lord Lieutenant of Glamorgan – John Stuart, Lord Mountstuart
Lord Lieutenant of Merionethshire - Sir Watkin Williams-Wynn, 4th Baronet
Lord Lieutenant of Montgomeryshire – George Herbert, 2nd Earl of Powis
Lord Lieutenant of Pembrokeshire – Richard Philipps, 1st Baron Milford
Lord Lieutenant of Radnorshire – Edward Harley, 4th Earl of Oxford and Earl Mortimer

Bishop of Bangor – John Warren
Bishop of Llandaff – Richard Watson
Bishop of St Asaph – Jonathan Shipley
Bishop of St Davids – Edward Smallwell

Events
March - Hester Piozzi returns from Italy with her second husband.
November - Richard Crawshay uses puddling at the Cyfarthfa ironworks.
December - Evan Evans (Ieuan Fardd), shortly before his death, sells his manuscript collection.
date unknown
Thomas Charles opens his first Sunday school, at Hengoed.
The first Cymmrodorion Society is disbanded.
Iolo Morganwg spends time as a prisoner in Cardiff jail.
Construction of Margam orangery begins.

Arts and literature

New books
John Thelwall - Poems upon various subjects

Music
Elis Roberts - Pedwar Chwarter y Flwyddyn
Nathaniel Williams - Ychydig o Hymnau Newyddion
William Williams Pantycelyn - Rhai Hymnau Newyddion

Sport
27 February - Royal British Bowmen, an archery society, formed in Wrexham.

Births
26 May - Richard Jones, printer (died 1855)
8 June - William Conybeare, geologist (died 1857)
9 July - Taliesin Williams, poet and author (died 1847)
2 October - Thomas Price (Carnhuanawc), historian (died 1848)

Deaths
3 February - Philip David, Independent minister, 77
24 May - Charles Morgan of Dderw, politician, 50
18 June - John Egerton, controversial Bishop of Bangor 1756–1768, 65
3 November - Robert Lowth, Bishop of St David's 1766, 76
date unknown 
William Elias, poet, 79

References

Wales
Wales